The 1901 San Diego mayoral election was held on April 2, 1901, to elect the mayor for San Diego. Frank P. Frary was elected Mayor with a majority of the votes.

Candidates
Frank P. Frary
Patterson Sprigg
Frank Simpson

Campaign
Incumbent Mayor Edwin M. Capps declined to run for re-election. Three candidates campaigned for the open seat: Frank P. Frary, a Republican, Patterson Sprigg, a Democrat and Frank Simpson, a Socialist.

On April 2, 1901, Frary was elected mayor with a majority of 59.1 percent of the vote. Sprigg came in second with 35.3 percent of the vote. Simpson came in third with 5.6 percent.

Election results

References

1901
1901 United States mayoral elections
1901 California elections
1901
April 1901 events